Eres Holz (born September 26, 1977 in Rehovot), is a German composer of Israeli origin. He has been living in Germany since 2003.

Life Biography 
Holz studied composition with Ruben Seroussi in Tel Aviv. From 2003 to 2011 he studied composition with Hanspeter Kyburz and electronic music with Wolfgang Heiniger at the Hochschule für Musik "Hanns Eisler" in Berlin, where since 2008 he has taught Algorithmic Composition with OpenMusic and Common Music.

His works have been performed in Germany, Switzerland, Israel, Spain and Australia, by Ensemble Adapter, Ensemble Zafraan, Modern Art Sextet, Trio Nexus, Ensemble Risonanze Erranti, Israel Contemporary Players, Ensemble Meitar and others, as well as broadcast on the national German public broadcaster Deutschlandradio and on Hessischer Rundfunk.

Since 2014 he has been a member of the Academy of German Composers (Akademie Deutscher Musikautoren)

Grants & Awards 
The Hanns Eisler Prize in Composition, in the category "Competition for Composition and Performance of Contemporary Music", 2005, 2008 and 2010. 
Nominated in 2012 for the German Music Authors' Prize, in the category "Promotion of young composers".
In 2012 he received the half-year residency at the Cité internationale des arts for 2013 in Paris (a scholarship of the Senate of Berlin).
In 2013, 2014 and 2015 he was awarded composition scholarships from the Senate of Berlin.
2017 Composer-in-residence at the German national broadcasting radio station - Deutschlandfunk

Music 
Eres Holz draws inspiration from engagement with extra-musical disciplines such as psychology and film. His composition LATAH (2006/07) was inspired by research into the Malaysian mental disorder of that name. Weisse Wunden (2008) is based on text by the Belgian director Jan Fabre. Holz makes this extra-musical content collide with semi-strict, intra-musical organizing principles developed using algorithmic models. In addition, Holz uses electronic sounds, often referencing a musical archaicism, which he contrasts with highly expressive instrumental gestures.

Press

List of Works (selection) 
 „Ein Mensch erkennt, dass er nie Mensch war“ (2023) for large ensemble, video and live-electronics
 MACH (2022) for recorder and live-electronics
 MACH (2021) for harp and live-electronics
 Insight (2021) for ensemble and live-electronics
 MACH (2020) for cello and electronics
 MACH (2020) for saxophone and electronics
 MACH (2020) for trombone and electronics
 MACH (2020) for accordion and electronics
 die frau (2020) for mezzo-soprano, recorder and double bass (after a poem by Constantin Virgil Bănescu)  
 Touching universes and ends (2019) for oboe/cor anglais, clarinet in si flat/bass clarinet, bassoon, piano, viola, cello, percussion and electronic; commissioned by Ensemble Aventure
 Gebt Frieden (2019) for mixed choir, trumpet, horn, trombone and piano
 Madrigal (2019) 2nd version for saxophone and accordion
 Colors of emptiness (2018) for flute, oboe/cor anglais, clarinet in b flat/basset horn and basson
 Dunkle Risse (2018) for string quartet; Commissioned by Deutschlandfunk 
 Madrigal (2018) for shawm and accordion
 Amor (2018) from Lamento della Ninfa, SV 163 / Claudio Monteverdi, Arrangement for shawm and accordion
 Fernen (2018) for mixed choir (Paul Celan)
 for whom the bell tolls; it tolls for thee (2018) miniature for saxophone, piano, accordion, viola and horn
 hautwärts (2018) for saxophone, piano, accordion, cello and trombone
 Ostrakon (2017) miniatur for clarinet, accordion and string quartet
 MACH (2017) for pipe organ; Commissioned by Deutschlandfunk 
 MACH (2017) for solo clarinet and Live electronics
 Schakalkopf (2016) for flute, clarinet, violin, viola and cello
 Kataklothes (2015) for large Ensemble; Commissioned by the Zafraan Ensemble, funded by the Ernst von Siemens Music Foundation
 Kaddisch nach Allen Ginsberg (2015) for Baritone singer, flute, oboe, trumpet, harp, electric guitar and percussion; Project "Mekomot-Orte": artistic director Sarah Nemtsov; Funded by the German Cultural Foundation, the Foundation "Remembrance, Responsibility and Future" and the German Music Council in cooperation with the Deutschlandfunk
 Chaconne (2014) for 6 instruments; commissioned by Meitar Ensemble  
 Nemesis (2014) for 12 instruments; commissioned by the Berlin Cultural Administration (2014); collaboration with Ensemble Risonanze Erranti (Conductor: Peter Tilling)  
 Study 1 in Markov-Chains (2014) coded in Common Music
 Vier Schatten (2013) for brass quintet; commissioned by the Berlin Cultural Administration (2013); collaboration with Ensemble Schwerpunkt  
 MACH (2012/13) for piano solo (dedicated to the international pianist Einav Yarden)
 Sich einstellender Sinn (2011) for mezzo-soprano, keyboard and live-electronics (lyric: Asmus Trautsch)
 MACH (2011) for trumpet solo
 Erd und Abgrund muss verstummen (2010) for keyboard, cello and live-electronics
 Trällernde Erinnerung (2010) for flute, clarinet, viola, piano and percussion
 Quartett (2009) for flute, clarinet, viola and piano
 Quintett (2009) for flute, clarinet, viola, piano and harp
 Weiße Wunden (2008) music theatre for three trumpets and video
 BLACK BOX (2007) for flute, piano and percussion
 LATAH (2006–07) for 15 musicians and live-electronics
 Moiré (2006–07) for accordion and clarinet
 Transmigration (2006) for fixed media
 Perspektiven (2005) for eleven musicians
 Zirkulationen (2004) for piano solo
 Frauen von Freunden (2003) for tenor, piano, harpsichord and harp (text: Kurt Tucholsky)

Discography 
 Touching Universes (2022), NEOS Music GmbH, EAN: 4260063122071
 Klangrede (2016), bastille musique, ASIN: B01N8XERA5
 Denkklänge (2013), Klang und Musik bei Walter Benjamin, Wilhelm Fink Verlag,

References

External links 
 Official website
 Publishing website at Edition Plante

Israeli composers
1977 births
Living people
21st-century classical composers
Male classical composers
21st-century male musicians